William Bingham (1743–1819) was Archdeacon of London from 1789 to 1813.

Biography
Bingham was born in Melcombe Bingham and educated at Brasenose College, Oxford. He was Vicar of Great Gaddesden until 1777;  and Rector of Hemel Hempstead  from 1778. In 1792 he was appointed an Honorary Chaplain to the King.

Family
Bingham married Agnata Dörrien in 1775: they had four children, one of whom, Arthur,  was a distinguished officer in the Royal Navy.

References

Alumni of Brasenose College, Oxford
Archdeacons of London
1743 births
1819 deaths
Honorary Chaplains to the King
People from Dorset